The 1992–93 Eintracht Frankfurt season was the 93rd season in the club's football history. In 1992–93 the club played in the Bundesliga, the top tier of German football. It was the club's 30th season in the Bundesliga.
Eintracht Frankfurt striker Tony Yeboah won the Bundesliga top goalscorer and scored, like Leverkusen's Ulf Kirsten, 20 Bundesliga goals.

Friendlies

Indoor soccer tournaments

Beck's-Cup

Competitions

Bundesliga

League table

Results by round

Matches

DFB-Pokal

UEFA Cup

Squad

Squad and statistics

|}

Notes

References

Sources

External links
 Official English Eintracht website 
 German archive site
 1992–93 Bundesliga season at Fussballdaten.de 

1992-93
German football clubs 1992–93 season